Aspidura guentheri, commonly known as Günther's rough-sided snake, is a species of snake in the family Colubridae. The species is endemic to Sri Lanka. It is the smallest member of the genus Aspidura.

Etymology
The specific name, guentheri, is in honor of German-born British herpetologist Albert Günther.

Geographic range
A. guentheri is a burrowing snake restricted to the lowlands of Sri Lanka.

Description
The head of A. guentheri is indistinct from the neck, and the body is cylindrical. The dorsum is brown, mottled with dark brown. The forehead is dark, and a pale neck band is present.  Running down the back are three rows of dark spots, one vertebral row and two lateral rows. The venter is light brown.

Scalation
A. guentheri has the following scalation. The dorsal scales are in 17 rows at midbody. One preocular is present. There are two postoculars, only the upper in contact with the parietal. The ventrals number 101-116, and the subcaudals 19-26 (M.A. Smith 1943).

Ecology
Diet of A. guentheri comprises mainly earthworms.

Reproduction
A. guentheri is oviparous. Clutches of one to three eggs are laid.

References

Further reading
Boulenger GA (1890). The Fauna of British India, Including Ceylon and Burma. Reptilia and Batrachia. London: Secretary of State for India in Council. (Taylor and Francis, printers). xviii + 541 pp. (Aspidura guentheri, p. 290).
Boulenger GA (1893). Catalogue of the Snakes in the British Museum (Natural History). Volume I., Containing the Families ... Colubridæ Aglyphæ, part. London: Trustees of the British Museum (Natural History). (Taylor and Francis, printers). xiii + 448 pp. + Plates I-XXVIII. (Aspidura guentheri, p. 312 + Plate XX, figure 3).
Ferguson W (1876). "Description of a New Snake of the Genus Aspidura ". Proc. Zool. Soc. London 1876: 819-820 (Aspidura guentheri, new species).
Smith MA (1943). The Fauna of British India, Ceylon and Burma, Including the Whole of the Indo-Chinese Sub-region. Reptilia and Amphibia. Vol. III.—Serpentes. London: Secretary of State for India. (Taylor and Francis, printers). xii + 583 pp. (Aspidura guentheri, p. 338).
Wall F (1921). Ophidia Taprobanica or the Snakes of Ceylon. Colombo, Ceylon [Sri Lanka]: Colombo Museum. (H.R. Cottle, Government Printer). xxii +  581 pp. (Aspidura guentheri, pp. 208–209).

Reptiles described in 1876
Aspidura
Reptiles of Sri Lanka